NorthEast United FC is a professional association football club based in Guwahati, Assam, India, that plays in Indian Super League. The club was formed in 2014 and played its first competitive match on 13 October 2014 and won against Kerala Blasters FC 1–0.

List of Indian players
As of 10 September 2022.

Appearance and goal totals only include matches in Indian Super League, which was first established in 2014. Substitute appearances are included.

List of overseas players
Appearance and goal totals only include matches in Indian Super League, which was first established in 2014. Substitute appearances are included.

The list includes all the overseas players registered under a NorthEast United FC contract. Some players might not have featured in a professional game for the club.

Notable former players

 Players who have represented their nations in FIFA World Cup.
 Alexandros Tzorvas
 Joan Capdevila
 Cornell Glen
 Leo Bertos
 Simão Sabrosa
 Didier Zokora
 Romaric
 Bartholomew Ogbeche
 Asamoah Gyan

References

NorthEast United FC players
Lists of Indian Super League players
Lists of association football players by club in India
Players
Association football player non-biographical articles